The T.League (Japanese: Tリーグ; Romaji: T.Rīgu) or Nojima T.League (Japanese: ノジマTリーグ) is the premier table tennis league of Japan which began in 2018. It is the first professional table tennis league in Japan. There are four teams in the men's division and six in the women's division.

Teams

Men's teams

Women's teams

Stadiums

Format and rules 
Each team match features one doubles match and at least three singles matches. If the score after four matches is 2–2, an extra-time, single-game "victory match" will determine the winner. T.League rules differ from international table tennis rules.

Match 1 players may not play in Match 2. Matches 2, 3, and 4 must feature different players for both teams.

Results

Men's division

Women's division

References

Official site  
  

Table tennis competitions in Japan
Sports leagues in Japan
Professional sports leagues in Japan
Sports leagues established in 2018
2018 establishments in Japan